Furuichi is a Japanese surname and place name. Furuichi can be translated as "old town" or "old market". It may refer to:

People 
 , minor Japanese lord and tea ceremony aficionado
 , Japanese tea master
 , Japanese civil engineer
 , guitarist for the Japanese rock band The Collectors
 , Japanese sumo wrestler
 , Japanese sociologist and author
 , Japanese freestyle wrestler

Places 
 ), a group of one hundred and twenty-three kofun (tombs) in Fujiidera and Habikino, Osaka Prefecture, Japan
 , several train stations
 , a town in Maebashi city, Gunma Prefecture, Japan
 , a place in Asaminami Ward, Hiroshima City, Japan

See also
 Old Town (disambiguation)

Japanese-language surnames